Alexandra "Alex" Agre (born December 14, 1988 as Alexandra Carlson) is an American curler.

Curling career

Junior
Agre is a two-time United States Junior Curling Champion with teammates Tabitha Peterson, Tara Peterson and Sophie Brorson, winning in 2009 and 2010. Representing the United States, Agre skipped her team at the 2009 World Junior Curling Championships, finishing in fifth place. At the 2010 World Junior Curling Championships, she led her team to a bronze medal.

Women's
In 2014, Agre joined the Erika Brown rink for one season, playing third. The team would go on to win the 2015 United States Women's Curling Championship. The next season, Agre returned to skipping a team before joining the Jamie Sinclair rink in 2016 as her third. In their first season together, they would win the 2017 United States Women's Curling Championship and would play in the 2017 Continental Cup of Curling. The team lost in the finals of the 2017 United States Olympic Curling Trials, missing out on the chance to play in the Olympics. Later that season they would win the 2018 United States Women's Curling Championship and would represent the United States at the 2018 Ford World Women's Curling Championship, where they finished fourth. The Sinclair rink made history at the 2018 Players' Championship when they became the first American rink to win a Grand Slam event. To finish the season, they had a quarterfinal finish at the 2018 Humpty's Champions Cup. The following season, Agre left the Sinclair rink as she was preparing to give birth.

Personal life
Agre works as a medical device quality consultant. She is a type 1 diabetic. She attended Marquette University. She has one daughter, Abigail.

Teams

References

External links

Living people
1988 births
American female curlers
Continental Cup of Curling participants
Sportspeople from Saint Paul, Minnesota
American curling champions
Marquette University alumni
People with type 1 diabetes
21st-century American women